Hellea is a Gram-negative, aerobic and heterotrophic genus of bacteria from the family of Hyphomonadaceae with one known species (Hellea balneolensis).

References

Bacteria genera
Monotypic bacteria genera